Manjhdhar (The Flow Of The River) or (Lost in Mid-stream) is a 1947 Hindi/Urdu historical drama film produced and directed by Sohrab Modi for Minerva Movietone. The story was by Pandit Sudarshan, with art direction by Rusi K. Banker and sound recording by M. Eduljee. It had music composed by Ghulam Haider, Gyan Dutt and Anil Biswas, the lyricist was Shams Lucknowi. The film starred Sohrab Modi, Khursheed, Surendra, Eruch Tarapore and Rafiq Ghaznavi.

Cast
 Sohrab Modi
 Khursheed
 Surendra
 Sadiq Ali
 Baby Tabassum
 Eruch Tarapore
 Rafiq Ghaznavi
 Surekha

Soundtrack
Majhdhar had music composed by  Ghulam Haider, Gyan Dutt and Anil Biswas while the lyricist was Shams Lucknowi. The singers were the actors Surendra and Khursheed Some of the notable songs of this film were "Jiske Milne Ki Tamanna Thi Wo Pyar Mil Gaya" composed by Ghulam Haider and sung by Khursheed, "Prem Nagar Ki Oar Chale Hain" composed by Gyan Dutt and sung by Khursheed and Surendra, and "Mera Chand Aa Gaya Mere Dware" composed by Anil Biswas and sung by Khursheed and Surendra.

Song list

References

External links
 
 Manjdhar at gomolo.com

1947 films
1940s Hindi-language films
1940s historical films
Films directed by Sohrab Modi
Films scored by Gyan Dutt
Indian historical films
Indian black-and-white films